Downtown Webb City Historic District is a national historic district located at Webb City, Jasper County, Missouri.   The district encompasses 43 contributing buildings in the central business district of Webb City.  It developed between about 1883 and 1965 and includes representative examples of Italianate, Renaissance Revival, Romanesque Revival, Art Deco, and Streamline Moderne style architecture. Located in the district is the previously listed Middle West Hotel. Other notable buildings include the National Bank (c. 1890), S. Morris Department Store (c. 1907), Morris Opera House and Royal Furniture Co. (c. 1890), The Unity Building and Merchant and Miners Bank (c. 1906), Aylor Building / Odd Fellow Hall (c. 1905), Mystic Theater (c. 1914), Newland Hotel (c. 1890), Dickenson Theater (c. 1928), Civic Theater (c. 1931), U.S. Post Office (c. 1916), and the Old U.S. Post Office  / Wagner Building (c. 1907).

It was listed on the National Register of Historic Places in 2014.

References

Historic districts on the National Register of Historic Places in Missouri
Renaissance Revival architecture in Missouri
Romanesque Revival architecture in Missouri
Italianate architecture in Missouri
Art Deco architecture in Missouri
Modernist architecture in Missouri
Buildings and structures in Jasper County, Missouri
National Register of Historic Places in Jasper County, Missouri